François Beths (8 January 1889 – 20 May 1973) was a Belgian racing cyclist. He rode in the 1920 Tour de France.

References

1889 births
1973 deaths
Belgian male cyclists
Place of birth missing